The Leyte Provincial Board is the Sangguniang Panlalawigan (provincial legislature) of the Philippine province of Leyte.

The members are elected via plurality-at-large voting: the province is divided into five legislative districts, each sending two members to the provincial board; the electorate votes for two members, with the two candidates with the highest number of votes being elected.

The districts used in appropriation of members is coextensive with the legislative districts of Leyte.

District apportionment

Current members

Vice Governor 
Leonardo M. Javier Jr., PDP–Laban - Presiding Officer

District Board Members

Ex officio Board Members

List of members
An additional three ex officio members are the presidents of the provincial chapters of the Association of Barangay Captains, the Councilors' League, the Sangguniang Kabataan provincial president; the municipal and city (if applicable) presidents of the Association of Barangay Captains, Councilors' League and Sangguniang Kabataan, shall elect amongst themselves their provincial presidents which shall be their representatives at the board.

However, with the recent controversy regarding the role of the Sangguniang Kabataan and the proposed amendments to the Local Government Code, specifically the Sangguniang Kabataan provisions, the Sangguniang Kabataan provincial chapter president did not serve as an ex officio member of the Provincial Board until 2019.

After the 2018 Barangay and Sangguniang Kabataan elections, the SK provincial chapter president has been seated as an ex officio member of the Provicial Board since 2019.

Vice Governor

Cayunda succeeded Bagulaya as Vice-Governor in November 2012 after Bagulaya succeeded Jericho Petilla as Governor, who in turn vacated his gubernatorial post after being appointed Energy Secretary.

1st District (excludes Tacloban City)
City: None
Municipalities: Alangalang, Babatngon, Palo, San Miguel, Santa Fe, Tanauan, Tolosa
Population (2015): 268,942

2nd District
Cities: none
Municipalities: Barugo, Burauen, Capoocan, Carigara, Dagami, Dulag, Jaro, Julita, La Paz, Macarthur, Mayorga, Pastrana, Tabontabon, Tunga
Population (2015): 406,359

3rd District
Cities: none
Municipalities: Calubian, Leyte, San Isidro, Tabango, Villaba
Population (2015): 179,594

4th District (excludes Ormoc City)
Cities: none
Municipalities: Albuera, Isabel, Kananga, Matag-ob, Merida, Palompon
Population (2015): 256,166

5th District
Cities: Baybay
Municipalities: Abuyog, Bato, Hilongos, Hindang, Inopacan, Javier, Mahaplag, Matalom
Population (2015): 398,587

Cayunda vacated the post after being appointed Vice Governor in November 2012.

Ex officio members

Philippine Councilors' League Provincial Federation

 
 Served in his capacity as councilor from Tacloban City.
 Served in his capacity as councilor from Palo, Leyte.
 Faller was temporarily seated in his capacity as the Vice-President of the Philippine Councilors' League Provincial Federation until the election of the League President.

League of Barangays of the Philippines Provincial Federation

Died in office, October 12, 2014.
Replaced Faller as LnBP Provincial President when Faller became a Sangguniang Bayan Member for Hilongos, Leyte in 2016.

Sangguniang Kabataan Provincial Federation

Committees

See also
 Leyte
 Legislative districts of Leyte

References

External links
 Official Website of the Province of Leyte

Provincial boards in the Philippines
Politics of Leyte (province)